Brockport High School is a High School located in Sweden, New York on the west side of Monroe County, USA. The current principal is Michael Pincelli. The previous local high school was the Brockport Central Rural High School in Brockport, New York, currently the A.D. Oliver Middle School, listed on the National Register of Historic Places in 2011. The Brockport Blue Devils won the 2003 NYSPHSAA Hockey Championship.

Notable alumni

Andy Parrino, American Professional Baseball Player
Jeff Van Gundy, NBA Coach and broadcaster
Jim Cosman, American Professional Baseball Player
Christopher John Farley, editor for The Wall Street Journal
Martin Ferrero, Actor
Carolyn Mackler, Author
Carl Muesebeck, American entomologist who specialized in the Hymenoptera.

See also
Brockport, New York
Brockport Central School District

References

External links
Official site

Public high schools in New York (state)
High schools in Monroe County, New York